St Mary the Virgin Church is a Church of England parish church in the village of Langley in the borough of Slough and the county of Berkshire in England. It is dedicated to St Mary the Virgin, and is in the diocese of Oxford. The church dates from about 1150 and is a Grade I listed building

The church houses the Kedermister Library, given by Sir John Kedermister (or Kederminster), who also endowed the surviving almshouses of 1617 in the village.

The churchyard is the resting place of Charles Morice (1775–1815), who was killed at the Battle of Waterloo and of the celebrated British war artist Paul Nash (1889–1946).

References

External links 
 
 St Mary's Church website

Church of England church buildings in Berkshire
Diocese of Oxford
Grade I listed churches in Berkshire
12th-century church buildings in England